Saline Island is a small islet between Grenada and Carriacou (Grenadines), owned by the John family, of Harvey Vale, Carriacou. It is located next to Frigate Island.

Uninhabited islands of Grenada